Lake May is a lake in Cass County, Minnesota, in the United States.

Lake May was named for May Griffith, the daughter of a county official.

See also
List of lakes in Minnesota

References

Lakes of Minnesota
Lakes of Cass County, Minnesota